Scopula patularia is a moth of the  family Geometridae. It is found in India.

References

Moths described in 1866
patularia
Moths of Asia